Angram Bottoms is a  biological Site of Special Scientific Interest (SSSI) near to the village of Angram in the Yorkshire Dales, England. The SSSI was first notified in 1989 and is due to the wet and dry grassland habitats which are unusual in the Yorkshire Dales.

References
 

Sites of Special Scientific Interest in North Yorkshire
Sites of Special Scientific Interest notified in 1989
Swaledale